Fastway may refer to:

 Fastway (bus rapid transit), a guided bus transport service in Crawley, UK
 Fastway Couriers, a courier franchise business headquartered in Napier, New Zealand
 Fastway (band), a British heavy metal band
 Fastway (album), the band's self-titled first album, 1983
 Fastway News, an Indian TV news channel launched in 2015